During the recovery of Orthodox Churches in the Second Polish Republic, a large number of Orthodox churches were demolished for a variety of reasons including:

 to reduce the influence of the Orthodox Church in Poland because it was seen as a representative of Russian power
 to reverse the Russification that had been carried out after the November Uprising (1830-1831)
 active Polonization of areas with Orthodox populations
 to remove derelict buildings for safety reasons after they were abandoned or didn't have enough faithful to provide for their upkeep

The destroyed churches 
Here is a partial list of those destroyed in order of their locations (the names are in Polish) and with the dates of the existence of the churches. Names are in italics if they changed denomination during their existence - often forcibly changed from the Eastern Catholic church. Cathedrals are in bold:

 Cerkiew św. Aleksandra Newskiego (1876-1920s) in Aleksandrów Kujawski
 Cerkiew Kazańskiej Ikony Matki Bożej (1553-1938) in Augustów
 Cerkiew św. św. Apostołów Piotra i Pawła (1878-1926) in Augustów
 Sobór Zmartwychwstania Pańskiego (1898-1938) in Białystok
 Cerkiew św. Michała Archanioła (1914–38) in Brzeźno
 Cerkiew Świętych Cyryla i Metodego (1884-1921) in Chełm
 Cerkiew św. Paraskiewy (1913-1931) in Chełm
 Cerkiew św. Jana Chrzciciela (1810-1938) in Choroszczynka
 Cerkiew św. Michała Archanioła (1875-1938) in Gołębie
 Cerkiew św. Marii Magdaleny (1876-1933) in Grajewo
 Cerkiew św. Michała Archanioła (1927-1938) in Holeszów
 Cerkiew Przemienienia Pańskiego (1773-1938) in Hrebenne
 Cerkiew św. Mikołaja (1912-1921) in Jędrzejów
 Cerkiew Wniebowstąpienia Pańskiego (1870-1933) in Kielce
 Cerkiew Świętych Kosmy i Damiana (1883-1938) in Kolechowice
 Cerkiew Zaśnięcia Matki Bożej (1846-1938) in Kolemczyce
 Cerkiew św. Mikołaja (1905-1929) in Kolno
 Cerkiew Trójcy Świętej (1902-after 1914) in Konin
 Cerkiew św. Marka (1686-1938) in Kopyłów
 Cerkiew Opieki Matki Bożej (1900s-1938) in Kozienice
 Cerkiew Przemienienia Pańskiego (1910-1938) in Kryłów
 Cerkiew Narodzenia Najświętszej Marii Panny (1569-1937) in Lipsk
 Cerkiew św. Aleksandra Newskiego (1893-after 1918) in Lubartów
 Sobór Podwyższenia Krzyża Pańskiego (1876-1925) in Lublin
 Cerkiew św. Mikołaja (1906-1920) in Łapy
 Cerkiew Narodzenia Najświętszej Marii Panny (1901-1936) in Łask
 Cerkiew w Łaskowie (1890-1938) in Łasków
 Cerkiew św. Mikołaja Cudotwórcy (1913-1936) in Łęczyca
 Cerkiew Świętych Kosmy i Damiana (1891-before 1939) in Łomazy
 Cerkiew Św. Ducha (1602-1938) in Małków
 Cerkiew św. Anny (1906-1938) in Międzyleś
 Cerkiew Opieki Matki Bożej (1902-1936) in Mińsk Mazowiecki
 Cerkiew św. Jerzego (1879-after 1918) in Mława
 Sobór św. Jerzego (1837-after 1918 ) in Modlin
 Cerkiew św. Włodzimierza (1911-1930) in Opoczno
 Cerkiew św. Mikołaja Cudotwórcy (1901-after 1920) in Ostrów Mazowiecka
 Cerkiew św. Jana Miłościwego (before 1472-1938) in Oszczów
 Cerkiew Narodzenia Matki Bożej (1632-1938) in Prehoryłe
 Cerkiew św. Aleksandra Newskiego (1903-after 1918) in Przasnysz
 Cerkiew Św. Trójcy (1905-after 1918) in Pułtusk
 Cerkiew św. Mikołaja Cudotwórcy (1912-1925) in Radomsko
 Cerkwie w Rypinie (1900-1937) in Rypin
 Cerkiew św. Serafina (1912-1928) in Sieradz
 Cerkiew św. Aleksego (1910-after 1918) in Skierniewice
 Cerkiew w Słupcy (1877-1928) in Słupca
 Cerkiew św. Mikołaja Cudotwórcy (1905-1938) in Sosnowiec
 Cerkiew św. Jerzego (1847-1938) in Strzelce
 Cerkiew św. Jerzego Zwycięzcy (before 1839-1936) in Szudziałowo
 Cerkiew św. Mikołaja Cudotwórcy (1901-1925) in Tomaszów Mazowiecki
 Cerkiew św. Eliasza (1800s-1938) in Ubrodowice
 Cerkiew Podwyższenia Krzyża Pańskiego (1912-1938) in Uhnin
 Cerkiew Zaśnięcia Matki Bożej (before 1875-1938) in Wakijów
 Alexander Nevsky Cathedral (1912-1924) in Warsaw
 Cerkiew św. Aleksandra Newskiego (1846-after 1918) in Łazienki Park, in Warsaw
 Cerkiew Matki Boskiej Nieustającej Pomocy (1902-1920s) in Warsaw
 Cerkiew św. Olgi (1902-1919) in Warsaw
 Church of the Archangel Michael (1894-1923) in Warsaw
 Cerkiew św. Mikołaja (1906-1925) in Włocławek

References 
 Polish Wikipedia category of destroyed Orthodox churches

Eastern Orthodoxy in Poland
20th-century Eastern Catholicism
Polish Orthodox churches
20th-century Eastern Orthodoxy